was a Japanese painter and luminary of the yōga (or Western-style) scene in the late Meiji, Taishō, and Shōwa eras. He was a member of the Japan Art Academy, an Imperial Household Artist, a recipient of the Order of the Sacred Treasure and Order of Culture, an Officier in the Légion d'honneur, and a Person of Cultural Merit.

Biography
Born in what is now the city of Tarumizu, Kagoshima Prefecture, Japan, in 1874, little Eisaku moved to Azabu in Tokyo with his family at the age of four or five when his father , a pastor, was appointed as an instructor in English at the Naval Academy. In 1887 the young Wada entered the Protestant ; among his classmates was fellow yōga painter , while author Tōson Shimazaki was in one of the years above. After learning the rudiments of Western-style painting from Uesugi Kumatsu, with his introduction, dropping out of Meiji Gakuin in 1891, he studied alongside Miyake and  under Soyama Sachihiko at his  painting school. After his death in 1892, Wada studied alongside Miyake at Harada Naojirō's ; the same year his work featured at the 4th  Exhibition, and again at the 5th in 1893. In 1893 he also studied Nihonga, under Kubota Beisen. After Harada's painting school closed in 1894, Wada studied under Kuroda Seiki and Kume Keiichirō, on their return from Paris, at their newly established , where he became versed in pleinairism. Kuroda was not alone in being struck by his student's precocious abilities: at the following year's Fourth National Industrial Exhibition, his Early Summer Beside the Sea was awarded a "Virtuosity Prize" (similarly honoured were Kuroda (for his scandalizing Morning Toilette), Kume, and Asai Chū).

In 1896 Wada was involved, along with Kuroda and Kume, in the establishment of the Hakuba-kai or "White Horse Society", submitting nineteen pieces for the 1st Exhibition that year; he would continue to submit paintings for their exhibitions until the 12th in 1909, even during the time he was in Europe. He spent half of 1898 guiding Adolf Fischer (de), future founder of the Museum of East Asian Art (Cologne), around various locales, including the Kinai and Hokuriku regions and Kyūshū. In 1899 Wada took up Fischer's invitation to assist with the cataloguing of his burgeoning collection of Japanese art, and travelled to Berlin; this was the time of the Berlin Secession. In March 1900 he moved to Paris, where he saw his Evening at the Ferry Crossing at the Grand Palais during the Exposition Universelle (where it received an Honourable Mention). There he studied, like Kuroda, Kume, and Okada, under Raphaël Collin at the Académie Colarossi, sponsored by the Monbusho. From Autumn 1901 to Spring the following year, Wada stayed in Grez-sur-Loing with Asai Chū, where they painted and penned their . In 1902 he learned decorative arts from Eugène Grasset who is a pioneer of Art Nouveau. His Thoughts of Home (Portrait of a Japanese Lady) appeared at the 1902 Salon organized by the Société des Artistes Français, while he sent Kodama back home for the Fifth National Industrial Exhibition, in 1903, where again he was awarded a runners-up prize. When he stayed in Paris, he held a gathering of haiku poets with Beisai Kubota.

Returning to Japan, via Italy, also in 1903 he was appointed professor at his alma mater. In 1904 he exhibited a landscape at the St. Louis World's Fair. Also in 1907, he married . In 1911 he painted the ceiling of the Imperial Theatre as well as murals for its dining room. In 1919 he became a member of the Imperial Fine Arts Academy. In 1920 he travelled again to Europe, returning in 1921 after his involvement in the display of Japanese works in an exhibition organized by the French government. In 1922 he was awarded the Order of the Sacred Treasure, 4th Class, and in 1923 membership in the Légion d'honneur with the rank of Officier. Also in 1923 he was appointed one of the judges at the second Chōsen Art Exhibition (ja) ("Senten"). In 1925 he transferred his official place of residence from Kagoshima to Tokyo. In 1926 one of his paintings was included in the 1st Exhibition in Honour of Shōtoku Taishi, and in each of 1929, 1936, and 1941 he was the subject of one-man shows at the Nihonbashi Mitsukoshi. In 1932 he became President of the Tokyo Academy of Fine Arts (he retired in 1936, to become an emeritus professor). In 1932 he published a book "Sketch-books of Seiki Kuroda".In 1933 he became a member of the Historical Sites, Places of Scenic Beauty, and Natural Monuments Examining Committee. In 1934 he became an Imperial Household Artist. In 1936 he completed his Ceremony for the Promulgation of the Constitution for the Meiji Memorial Picture Gallery. In 1937 he became a member of the Imperial Art Academy. For three years from 1940 he was involved in the copying of the wall paintings of the Hōryū-ji kondō. In 1943 he was a recipient of the Order of Culture. In 1945 he evacuated to what is now Yamatokōriyama in Nara Prefecture, then to Chiryū in Aichi Prefecture. In 1951 he was recognized as a Person of Cultural Merit and moved to Shimizu in Shizuoka Prefecture, where he died in 1959, posthumously receiving the Order of the Sacred Treasure, 1st Class.

Works
Representative works include his early Evening at the Ferry Crossing (1897), Thoughts of Home (1902), and Kodama (1902); his mid-life series of portraits; and his late Ue-no-Midō (1945) and Summer Clouds (1950). He painted many still lifes with flowers, especially roses, and a number of views of Mount Fuji. His Evening at the Ferry Crossing depicts a family of farmers at the Yaguchi crossing (ja) of the Tama River, strikingly illuminated, according to art historian , through his "skillful manipulation of evening light".

Exhibitions
Dedicated retrospectives include the 2002 , at the Shizuoka Prefectural Museum of Art, 2007 , at the Kariya City Art Museum, 2014 , at the Kagoshima City Museum of Art, and 2016 , again at the Kariya City Art Museum.

Gallery

See also

 Japonisme

References

External links
 Tobunken bio 

1874 births
1959 deaths
Yōga painters
Members of the Japan Art Academy
Imperial household artists
Recipients of the Order of Culture
Persons of Cultural Merit
Recipients of the Order of the Sacred Treasure
Officiers of the Légion d'honneur
19th-century Japanese painters
20th-century Japanese painters
Artists from Kagoshima Prefecture